Vrhovo pri Žužemberku is a small settlement above the left bank of the Krka River in the Municipality of Žužemberk in southeastern Slovenia. The area is part of the historical region of Lower Carniola. The municipality is now included in the Southeast Slovenia Statistical Region.

Name
The name of the settlement was changed from Vrhovo to Vrhovo pri Žužemberku in 1953.

Church

The local church is dedicated to the Holy Cross and belongs to the Parish of Žužemberk. It is a medieval building first mentioned in written documents dating to 1526. It was completely restyled in the Baroque in the 17th century.

References

External links

Vrhovo pri Žužemberku at Geopedia

Populated places in the Municipality of Žužemberk